Marousi 2004 is a baseball team based in Marousi , Athens.They have won 5 Greek Baseball League titles which makes them the second more successful team in Greece after Spartakos Glyfadas.

Baseball teams in Greece